A fingerpick is a type of plectrum used most commonly for playing bluegrass style banjo music. Most fingerpicks are composed of metal or plastic (usually Celluloid or Delrin). Unlike flat guitar picks, which are held between the thumb and finger and used one at a time, fingerpicks clip onto or wrap around the end of the fingers and thumb; thus one hand can pick several strings at once. Generally four are used: one for the thumb, and one each for the ring, middle and index fingers. Fingerpicks worn on the thumb are generally called "thumbpicks". Some players use a plastic thumbpick while using metal fingerpicks. Fingerpicks come in a variety of thicknesses to accommodate different musicians' styles of playing. Thin picks produce a quieter, more delicate sound, while thick picks produce a heavier sound. But as with standard plectrums, thumbpicks come in different styles and employ different materials.

Fingerpicks are also used by guitar, Hawaiian guitar, lap steel, autoharp, pedal steel guitar and Dobro players. Fingerpicks generally take quite some time to adapt to, even for people who come from the more common (bare fingers with or without fingernails) fingerstyle techniques. Tone wise, they are the most similar to standard guitar picks, as they offer a more consistent sound.

Some players combine a thumb pick and bare fingers/fingernails.

Classical guitar players, who traditionally use their fingernails to pluck the guitar's strings, may choose to use fingerpicks as an alternative to maintaining fingernails.

See also
Fingerstyle guitar
Hybrid picking

Guitar parts and accessories